Foord is an English surname, being a variant of Ford. 

Notable people with the surname include:

Ben Foord, South African boxer
Bert Foord, English meteorologist 
Bill Foord, English cricketer
Caitlin Foord, Australian footballer 
Heather Foord, Australian television journalist 
Richard Foord, British politician
Stu Foord, Canadian football running back

See also
 Forde (disambiguation)
 Ford (disambiguation)